In mathematics, an element  of a ring  is called nilpotent if there exists some positive integer , called the index (or sometimes the degree), such that .

The term, along with its sister idempotent, was introduced by Benjamin Peirce in the context of his work on the classification of algebras.

Examples 

This definition can be applied in particular to square matrices. The matrix
 
is nilpotent because . See nilpotent matrix for more.

 In the factor ring , the equivalence class of 3 is nilpotent because 32 is congruent to 0 modulo 9.

By definition, any element of a nilsemigroup is nilpotent.

Properties 
No nilpotent element can be a unit (except in the trivial ring, which has only a single element ). All nilpotent elements are zero divisors.

If  is nilpotent, then  is a unit, because  entails 

More generally, the sum of a unit element and a nilpotent element is a unit when they commute.

Commutative rings 
The nilpotent elements from a commutative ring  form an ideal ; this is a consequence of the binomial theorem. This ideal is the nilradical of the ring. Every nilpotent element  in a commutative ring is contained in every prime ideal  of that ring, since . So  is contained in the intersection of all prime ideals.

If  is not nilpotent, we are able to localize with respect to the powers of :  to get a non-zero ring . As every non-zero commutative ring has a maximal ideal, which is prime, every non-nilpotent  is not contained in some prime ideal. Thus  is exactly the intersection of all prime ideals.

A characteristic similar to that of Jacobson radical and annihilation of simple modules is available for nilradical: nilpotent elements of ring  are precisely those that annihilate all integral domains internal to the ring  (that is, of the form  for prime ideals ).  This follows from the fact that nilradical is the intersection of all prime ideals.

Nilpotent elements in Lie algebra 
Let  be a Lie algebra. See also: Jordan decomposition in a Lie algebra.

Nilpotency in physics

Any ladder operator in a finite dimensional space is nilpotent.  They represent creation and annihilation operators, which transform from one state to another, for example the raising and lowering Pauli matrices . 

An operand  that satisfies  is nilpotent. Grassmann numbers which allow a path integral representation for Fermionic fields are nilpotents since their squares vanish. The BRST charge is an important example in physics.

As linear operators form an associative algebra and thus a ring, this is a special case of the initial definition. More generally, in view of the above definitions, an operator  is nilpotent if there is  such that  (the zero function). Thus, a linear map is nilpotent iff it has a nilpotent matrix in some basis. Another example for this is the exterior derivative (again with ). Both are linked, also through supersymmetry and Morse theory, as shown by Edward Witten in a celebrated article.

The electromagnetic field of a plane wave without sources is nilpotent when it is expressed in terms of the algebra of physical space. More generally, the technique of microadditivity (which can used to derive theorems in physics) makes use of nilpotent or nilsquare infinitesimals and is part smooth infinitesimal analysis.

Algebraic nilpotents
The two-dimensional dual numbers contain a nilpotent space. Other algebras and numbers that contain nilpotent spaces include split-quaternions (coquaternions), split-octonions,
biquaternions , and complex octonions  . If a nilpotent infinitesimal is a variable tending to zero, it can be shown that any sum of terms for which it is the subject is an indefinitely small proportion of the first order term.

See also
Idempotent element (ring theory)
Unipotent
Reduced ring
Nil ideal

References 

Ring theory
0 (number)
Algebraic properties of elements